Jamal Omid (born in 1946, Rasht), is an Iranian author, screenwriter and film critic.

Career
Omid started his career as a journalist in 1964 with Khoushe (Cluster) Magazine whose then editor-in-chief was Ahmad Shamlou. Omid later joined various cinema magazines including Cinema and Star of Cinema in 1976.

Omid is a cofounder and a former chairman of Iran's Cinema Museum.

Filmography 
Omid's filmography includes:

References 

1946 births
Living people
Iranian writers
Iranian journalists
People from Rasht